Tamaroa is a village in the Tamaroa Precinct of Perry County, Illinois, United States. The population was 638 at the 2010 census.

History
The village is named after the Tamaroa, an Illiniwek people.

Geography

Demographics

As of the census of 2000, there were 740 people, 300 households, and 201 families residing in the village. The racial makeup of the village was 97.84% White, 0.14% African American, 1.08% Native American, 0.41% Asian, 0.14% from other races, and 0.41% from two or more races. Hispanic or Latino of any race were 0.54% of the population.

There were 300 households, out of which 29.0% had children under the age of 18 living with them, 50.7% were married couples living together, 10.0% had a female householder with no husband present, and 32.7% were non-families. 27.0% of all households were made up of individuals, and 14.3% had someone living alone who was 65 years of age or older. The average household size was 2.47 and the average family size was 2.94.

In the village, the population was spread out, with 23.5% under the age of 18, 10.9% from 18 to 24, 28.8% from 25 to 44, 21.2% from 45 to 64, and 15.5% who were 65 years of age or older. The median age was 37 years. For every 100 females, there were 95.8 males. For every 100 females age 18 and over, there were 93.8 males.

The median income for a household in the village was $25,682, and the median income for a family was $36,607. Males had a median income of $31,111 versus $16,944 for females. The per capita income for the village was $14,573. About 13.4% of families and 17.3% of the population were below the poverty line, including 24.4% of those under age 18 and 13.0% of those age 65 or over.

Notable persons

 Roy Alden, Illinois politician and newspaper editor
 Frank Donnelly, pitcher for the Chicago Colts
 Charles Wayne Goforth, Illinois politician
 Logan H. Roots, American politician
 Logan H. Roots, (1870 - 1945) Episcopal missionary to China and Bishop of Hankow

References

Villages in Perry County, Illinois
Villages in Illinois